Cris Brodahl (born 1963 in Ghent, Belgium) is a contemporary visual artist based in Ghent, Belgium. Brodahl's paintings are based on collages she makes from magazine images.

Cris Brodahl has shown internationally in exhibitions including Electric Blue at Xavier Hufkens in Brussels, Cut at The Approach in London, and Marc Foxx in Los Angeles.

Her work is in the collection of the Seattle Art Museum.

References

External links
Cris Brodahl at Xavier Hufkens, Brussels
Cris Brodahl at The Approach

1963 births
Living people
Artists from Ghent
Contemporary painters
Belgian painters
Belgian women painters
20th-century Belgian women artists
21st-century Belgian women artists